John Morrell was a professional rugby league footballer who played in the 1920s. He played at club level for the Featherstone Rovers (Heritage № 14).

Club career
John Morrell made his début for the Featherstone Rovers on Monday 29 August 1921.

References

External links
Search for "Morrell" at rugbyleagueproject.org

Featherstone Rovers players
Place of birth missing
Place of death missing
English rugby league players
Year of birth missing
Year of death missing